
This is a list of the 34 players who earned their 2004 PGA Tour card through Q School in 2003.

Players in yellow are 2004 PGA Tour rookies.

2004 Results

*PGA Tour rookie in 2004
T = Tied 
Green background indicates the player retained his PGA Tour card for 2005 (finished inside the top 125). 
Yellow background indicates the player did not retain his PGA Tour card for 2005, but retained conditional status (finished between 126-150). 
Red background indicates the player did not retain his PGA Tour card for 2005 (finished outside the top 150).

Winners on the PGA Tour in 2004

Runners-up on the PGA Tour in 2004

See also
2003 Nationwide Tour graduates

References
Player profiles
Money list

PGA Tour Qualifying School
PGA Tour Qualifying School Graduates
PGA Tour Qualifying School Graduates